"#HappyHolograms" is the tenth and final episode in the eighteenth season of the American animated television series South Park.  The 257th episode overall, it was written and directed by series co-creator and co-star Trey Parker. The episode premiered on Comedy Central in the United States on December 10, 2014. It is the second part of the two-part season finale which began with the previous episode, "#REHASH". The episode makes multiple references to earlier episodes over the season, as well as to previous seasons, while mainly lampooning the trend of culture constantly making trending topics with no actual relevance. It also lampoons news events such as the death of Eric Garner, the shooting of Michael Brown, the sexual assault allegations against Bill Cosby, the use of celebrity holograms, and generationism. YouTuber PewDiePie appears as himself, continuing his story line from the previous episode.

Plot

Continuing from the previous episode, "#REHASH", Kyle Broflovski laments how his younger brother Ike's generation's preoccupation with trending topics and Let's Play videos has led him to be seen as an out-of-touch "grandpa" by younger kids. Kyle sends out a Twitter message to help families come together. In response, Bill Cosby appears at Kyle's home to invite him to participate in a television special to be watched by families together. Kyle agrees, but after Cosby leaves, he is revealed to be a hologram.

Randy and Sharon Marsh go to the police to report the hologram of Randy created by his ex-manager to replace his stage persona Lorde, but the police are skeptical. Meanwhile, a patrolman brings in the rogue Michael Jackson hologram, but even though the patrolman says he shot the hologram and used a chokehold on him, the hologram's light skin and features present a problem for the police, as they can only use such harsh tactics on black people.

The television special will feature various celebrities, holograms of deceased celebrities, and LP commentary by Eric Cartman. The special is the brainchild of Randy's ex-producer and Cartman. The producer's staff, however, feel he has given too much power to Cartman, whose growing popularity results in his commentary window appearing not only on computers and other devices but in thin air throughout the episode. Upon seeing a TV commercial for the special, Kyle is angered that his idea has been turned into a social media project, while his best friend, Stan Marsh, is upset because he thinks his father, Randy, is performing again as Lorde.

Randy and the Jackson hologram learn about the television special and its intent and agree to work together to stop it. When the Tupac Shakur hologram sent to capture the Jackson hologram appears at the police station, Randy and the Jackson hologram flee to the Marsh home. Randy then learns that Stan and Kyle have been taken hostage by his ex-producer, and is confronted by the Shakur hologram in his home.

When Kyle asks the producer why he is doing this, the producer explains that when he became a grandfather, one day he asked his grandson who his favorite celebrity was, and his grandson said it was PewDiePie. Distressed that his grandson worshiped an insignificant Internet personality, and was unimpressed with anyone else to whom he tried to introduce himself, the producer reveals his true intention that with the television special, he will assimilated younger generation's culture into his own. Stan is astonished that the producer is "such a grandpa", much to his frustration. When Cartman's window appears before the producer, he attempts to have him shut down, but Cartman is trending so much and has grown so powerful that he has reached "trend-scendence".

Having become self-aware as Cartman continues to appear on screens all around the world, he states that he is now "trends-gender" and therefore must be given his bathroom, which was his motivation for being involved in this plan. The Shakur and Jackson holograms decide to team up against the producer and go to the restaurant where he is hiding with the hostages. As Jackson fatally shoots the producer, Kyle, realizing that everyone on the planet can see everyone else on their computers, speaks out to his brother, Ike, apologizing for being a "grandpa". He accepts that Ike will develop his generational interests, and admits that he was merely sore that Ike was a fan of Cartman in particular. He says that he just wants to be a family again. Ike and his friends resolve to get the public to "believe" again and create a new trend with the hashtag #webelieveinyou, which Kyle, breaking the fourth wall, urges the audience to spread. In response, PewDiePie's window appears before Cartman, and his commentary is so much powerful that Cartman's window is eliminated, deleting him from its existence.

In an epilogue, Kyle says he managed to get their family to use the living room again for one hour each night, though Stan is still confused over the events that have just concluded. Kyle suggests that perhaps they are not going to understand it, and further says that at least YouTube celebrities are authentic, and have not been marketed to the public by corporations and entertainment industries. Afterward, PewDiePie's window then appears before them, he thanks South Park for being on his show.

Production
The episode contains numerous references to previous episodes in the series, mostly in connection to Randy Marsh's double life as Lorde. Customer service employee "Steve" returns from "Grounded Vindaloop", as does the Washington Redskins logo from "Go Fund Yourself", while Cartman's desire for his own bathroom is from "The Cissy".

On the DVD audio commentary, Trey Parker and Matt Stone, in hindsight, thought the story would have been better off split up into three episodes and not two, mainly because there was a lot of content left that they wanted to use but not enough time. The original plan was to make the story three episodes long but they settled for two.

The episode makes numerous references to the deaths of Eric Garner and Michael Brown, as well as the sexual assault allegations against Bill Cosby.

Reception
The episode received a B rating from The A.V. Clubs Dan Caffrey, though he stated that "It was rushed, it was messy, and it may have been just a bit too much story for South Park, even for a two-parter."

Max Nicholson of IGN gave it a 6.8 out of 10, and stated "the climax of the entire episode (and arguably the season)...didn't tie everything together in the way that it could (and should) have."

Chris Longo from Den of Geek gave the episode 4 out of 5 stars, stating the episode "was incoherent, hilarious madness—its own artform." Longo's article also noted that, in real life, the topic #IHateCartmanBrah became the top trending topic worldwide on Twitter.

References

External links
 "HappyHolograms" Full episode at South Park Studios
 

Cross-dressing in television
Cultural depictions of Bill Cosby
Cultural depictions of Elvis Presley
Cultural depictions of Michael Jackson
Holography in television
Cultural depictions of Tupac Shakur
South Park episodes in multiple parts
South Park (season 18) episodes
Television episodes with live action and animation
Television episodes about advertising
Television episodes about the Internet
Television episodes about Internet culture
Television episodes about social media
American Christmas television episodes